This is a list of local government areas (LGAs) in New South Wales, sorted by region.  there were 128 local government areas in New South Wales, there are 33 local government areas in Greater Sydney and 95 local government areas in Regional NSW. All councils are listed below in alphabetical order by region. There is also the Unincorporated Far West Region which is not part of any local government area, in the sparsely inhabited Far West, and Lord Howe Island, which is also unincorporated but self-governed by the Lord Howe Island Board.

Norfolk Island Regional Council also subject to the state-level legislation of New South Wales.

Maps showing local government areas in New South Wales

Local government areas sorted by region

Greater Sydney

Greater Metropolitan Sydney

Sydney Surrounds

Rural and Regional areas

Central Coast

Mid North Coast

Murray

The Riverina

Greater Metropolitan Newcastle and Hunter

Illawarra

Northern Rivers

South East Region

New England

Central West

Orana

Far West

Former local government areas in New South Wales

See also

 List of local government areas in New South Wales
 Local government in Australia
 NSW Regional Organisations of Councils

References

External links 
 New South Wales Office of Local Government Directory
 Map of Local Government Areas in New South Wales PDF
 Clickable map of New South Wales LGAs (New South Wales Department of Local Government)
 

 
New South Wales
New South Wales-related lists